is a virtual YouTuber agency owned by Japanese tech entertainment company Cover Corporation. In addition to acting as a multi-channel network, Hololive Production also handles merchandising especially in music production and concert organization. As of January 2023, the agency manages 75 VTubers from three different native languages (Japanese, Indonesian and English), totalling over 50 million subscribers, including several of the most subscribed VTubers on YouTube.

The name "Hololive" was initially used for Cover's 3D stream distribution app, launched in December 2017, and later its female VTuber agency, whose first generation debuted from May to June 2018. In December 2019, Hololive was merged with Cover's male Holostars agency and INoNaKa music label under the unified "Hololive Production" brand.

History

2016–19: Beginnings and growth

 was founded on 13 June 2016 by  an entrepreneur who had developed video game characters in collaboration with Sanrio at the content company Imagineer and founded various startup companies. Cover at first focused on augmented (AR) and virtual reality (VR) software, and received funding from incubator firms Tokyo VR Startups and Recruit.

At the end of March 2017, the company showcased a tech demo for a program enabling real-time avatar motion capture and interactive, two-way live streaming. According to Tanigo, the idea for a "virtual idol" agency was inspired by other virtual characters, such as Hatsune Miku. Kizuna AI, who began the virtual YouTuber trend in 2016, was another likely inspiration.

Cover debuted , the first VTuber using the company's avatar capture software, on 7 September 2017. On 21 December, the company released hololive, a smartphone app for iOS and Android enabling users to view virtual character live streams using AR camera technology. On 5 April 2018, Cover removed the application's AR features and changed it into a tool for mapping a user's facial movements onto animated avatars in real-time. This update enabled at-home auditions using the iPhone X. The first generation of Hololive VTubers debuted from May to June 2018, and a second generation followed in August and September. Hololive Gamers, a group specializing in let's plays, debuted in December 2018 and April 2019.

On 8 January 2019, Hololive announced that it had signed a contract with the Chinese video platform Bilibili, under which it would open 15 channels on the platform and simultaneously stream there and on YouTube. It would also begin collaborating with Chinese-speaking volunteers to translate Hololive videos, and start releasing original content for the Chinese market. On 17 May, Cover opened permanent talent auditions in China and Japan.

On 19 May, Cover formed an in-house music label, INoNaKa (INNK) Music, from AZKi and former independent VTuber Hoshimachi Suisei. The 1st generation of Holostars, a new all-male VTuber agency, began debuting in June 2019, followed by more in September and October of the same year. A 2nd generation of Holostars talents debuted in December 2019, and a 3rd generation would later debut in May 2020. A 3rd generation of Hololive, "Hololive Fantasy", debuted from July to August 2019. A first generation of Hololive China, a Chinese-speaking branch active on Bilibili, debuted from September 2019 to January 2020. A second generation of Hololive China later debuted in April 2020.

On 2 December 2019, Cover consolidated its Hololive, INNK Music, and Holostars agencies under a unified brand named Hololive Production; the three entities continued to operate under their respective management teams. On the same day, Hoshimachi Suisei transferred to Hololive from INNK, leaving AZKi as the label's only member. A fourth generation of the original Hololive branch debuted late December 2019 and early January 2020. The generation included VTuber Kiryu Coco who would later become the most superchatted channel on Youtube until her graduation from Hololive.

2020–present: Expansion

On 24 January 2020, Cover held "hololive 1st fes. Nonstop Story", a concert at the Toyosu Pit in Kōtō, Tokyo, with AZKi and all 22 pre–4th generation Hololive members. "Nonstop Story" was attended by 3000 people on site with "tens of thousands" more tuning in via livestream. On 21 and 22 December 2020, Cover held "hololive 2nd fes. Beyond the Stage", a two-day pay-per-view livestream follow-up to "Nonstop Story", featuring the same cast as well as the 4th generation members as an opening act, as a collaboration with the Japanese entertainment company Bushiroad. At the concert's end, Cover announced Hololive's first original-only concert, titled "Hololive Idol Project 1st Live 'Bloom,'", which was held on 17 February 2021 at Tokyo Garden Theatre (in-person viewing was later cancelled).

At the end of the concert, Cover announced a multimedia project entitled Hololive Alternative, releasing a promotional video. On 8 August 2021, Hololive announced its horror project titled "Hololive ERROR" with a live-action teaser featuring Tokino Sora. The project was revealed to be a horror game featuring Hololive members playing as in-game NPCs. A demo was released for free on 7 January 2022 in Japanese while the full version of the game was released on 16 September on Steam with both Japanese and English subtitles.

A new branch of Hololive composed of Indonesian-speaking VTubers, named Hololive Indonesia, debuted its first generation in April 2020; a second generation of the branch later debuted in December 2020; A third generation of the branch debuted in March 2022. A fifth generation of the main Hololive branch debuted in August 2020. A new English-language Hololive branch, Hololive English, debuted in September 2020. IRyS, an English-language "VSinger", debuted as part of "Project: Hope" on 11 July 2021. Hololive Council, a second generation of English-language Vtubers, debuted on 22 August 2021. The sixth generation of the main Hololive branch debuted in late November 2021.

On 29 December 2021, Cover announced the transfer of AZKi from INNK into the main Hololive branch. As part of the transfer process, INNK would be dissolved and its founder Tsuranimizu would step down from the position of AZKi's manager. The process was completed in April 2022.

On 24 February 2022, Cover Corporation announced the termination of their contract with Hololive Generation 3's Uruha Rushia, citing violations of her contract that "caused the company to take reputational damage". At the moment of her termination, Uruha Rushia was the highest superchat earner on YouTube and within Hololive Production, the second to hold these titles after Kiryu Coco, who retired in 2021.

In June 2022, Hololive GAMERS member Inugami Korone became the official brand ambassador for the Sonic the Hedgehog franchise in Japan. She would later appear in the Sonic the Hedgehog 2 film as the voice actress for one of the characters in the Japanese dub, and Korone-themed downloadable content would be released for the game Sonic Frontiers.

On 12 July 2022, Cover announced that Hololive English member Tsukumo Sana would graduate at the end of the month, citing health reasons.

On 18 July 2022, Cover revealed their first English-speaking male group, Holostars English Tempus, who were set to debut at the end of the same week.

Taiwan controversy and suspensions 

In September 2020, Kiryu Coco and Akai Haato each mentioned Taiwan on-stream while discussing YouTube channel analytics, which then listed Taiwan as a country in the Japanese interface. Their comments sparked outrage among viewers in mainland China, and were followed by a statement from Cover in Japanese, English, and Chinese on 27 September. In it, the company faulted the talents for "making statements insensitive to certain nationalities" and for "divulging confidential YouTube channel analytics information". Each received a three-week suspension from all activities.

In a separate Chinese-only statement posted earlier on Bilibili, Cover had stated that Coco and Haato's comments did not reflect its policy on China, and reaffirmed its support for the One-China policy and its commitment to doing business in the country. Three days later, the company released another statement addressing the discrepancies between the messages, stating that the Bilibili statement was released "due to the desire to adapt it to the needs of the audience". Cover apologized for confusion it had caused, and announced changes in its procedure for releasing regional statements and the formation of a committee to prevent similar incidents. On 19 October, both resumed their streaming activities, as scheduled.

After a "rush of harassment, reports, and apparent boycotting on Bilibili", all six members of Hololive China retired on different dates in late 2020.

Business 
Along with its major competitor Nijisanji, a VTuber agency owned by Anycolor, Inc., Hololive Production dominates the corporate VTuber market as of 2022. By "harness[ing] the entertainment value of both streaming and J-pop idol groups", Cover operates at a scale not possible for independent VTubers, and has used its funding to create merchandise, produce music, and host live 3D events. As of 2021, Cover has held three major funding rounds:

 August 2017 – 30 million yen (US$280,000) in seed funding from venture capital firms Mizuho Capital, TLM, and angel investors
 June 2018 – 200 million yen (US$1.9 million) in a Series A round from GREE Ventures, OLM Ventures, and Mizuho Capital
 May 2020 – 700 million yen (US$6.6 million) from various sources, including Hakuhodo DY Ventures and SMBC Venture Capital

Most Hololive streamers work full-time, while others stream as a side job. According to data collection site Playboard, the all-time top Super Chat earners in history are channels run by Hololive talents: Uruha Rushia, Kiryu Coco, Usada Pekora and Houshou Marine. Other talents featured in the all-time top 10 include Minato Aqua, Amane Kanata and Yukihana Lamy.

By September 2020, Hololive channels had more than 10 million combined subscribers on YouTube, and 10 million additional combined subscribers on Chinese platform Bilibili. , the agency has accumulated over 50 million subscribers across its 50+ channels on YouTube. On 22 October, English VTuber Gawr Gura became the first Hololive member to reach 1 million YouTube subscribers; on 17 January 2021, she became the first Hololive member to reach 2 million subscribers on the platform and the second VTuber to do so, after Kizuna AI. Gawr Gura became the first VTuber to reach 3 million subscribers on YouTube on 4 July 2021, having surpassed Kizuna AI at 2.97 million on 30 June.

According to Tanigo, Hololive's primary audience are mostly males in their mid-teens to mid-thirties, with Japanese fans being mostly those who are interested in video games while overseas viewers are more likely to be anime fans specifically. Hololive's overseas audiences are primarily from North America and Asia, especially South East Asia.

CEO Motoaki Tanigo was selected as one of the Japan's Top 20 Entrepreneurs by Forbes Japan in its January 2022 issue.

Talents 
Below are all active and former talents of Hololive.

Hololive

Generation 0
 
 
 
 
  (former member of INNK)

Generation 1
 
 
 
 
 

Generation 2
 
 
 
 
 

Hololive GAMERS
 
 
 
 

Generation 3 (Hololive Fantasy)
 
 
 
 

Generation 4 (holoForce)
 
 
 
 

Generation 5 (NePoLaBo)
 
 
 
 

Generation 6 (Secret Society holoX)

Holostars

Generation 1
 
 
 
 

Generation 2 (SunTempo)
 
 
 

Generation 3 (MaFia)
 
 

UPROAR!!

Hololive Indonesia

Generation 1 (AREA 15)
 
 
 

Generation 2 (holoro)
 
 
 

Generation 3 (holoh3ro)

Hololive English

Myth
 
 
 
 
 

Project: HOPE
 

Council

Holostars English
TEMPUS

Headquarters
 
 
 
 

Vanguard

Former talents

Hololive
 
 
 
 

Holostars
 
 
 

Hololive English
 

Hololive China
 Yogiri
 Civia
 Spade Echo
 Doris
 Rosalyn
 Artia

Media and events

Selected discography

Hololive 
All group releases to date have been performed by "holololive IDOL PROJECT", a group that consists of different talents for each release.

As lead up to Nonstop Story

As lead up to "Bloom,"

Others 
 "Halloween Night, Tonight!" – 23 October 2020
  / – 1 September 2021, performed by sub-unit NEGI☆U (Minato Aqua, Oozora Subaru, and Momosuzu Nene), used as ending theme for the anime The Great Jahy Will Not Be Defeated!. Debuted at #17 on the Oricon Singles Chart.
  "Prism Melody" - 13 March 2022 - Released as lead up to "Link Your Wish".

Holostars

Explanatory notes

References

External links 

 

 
Japanese idol groups
Japanese talent agencies
Multi-channel networks
Mass media companies based in Tokyo
Mass media companies established in 2016
Entertainment companies established in 2016
Technology companies established in 2016
Japanese companies established in 2016
Chūō, Tokyo